"I Believe in Love" is the debut solo single by American musician Kenny Loggins. It was written by Loggins with lyrics by Alan and Marilyn Bergman. The song was introduced by Barbra Streisand in the 1976 film A Star Is Born, and appears on its soundtrack album. It was released in November 1976 as the B-side to the album's first single, "Evergreen (Love Theme from A Star Is Born)".

Loggins later recorded it for his debut solo album Celebrate Me Home and released it as the album's first single in the summer of 1977. It became Loggins' first charting single, reaching number 66 on the U.S. Billboard Hot 100 and number 37 on the Easy Listening chart.  In Canada, the song reached number 45 on the main singles chart and number 41 on the AC chart.

Charts

Kenny Loggins version

Cover versions
 Rosemary Clooney and Woody Herman and Woody's Big Band recorded "I Believe in Love" for the album My Buddy (1983).
 Johnny Mathis's version appears on his Live album (1983).
 Deanna Dubbin's version appears on her With One More Look at You album (2005).
 Jim Speake's version appears on his My Generation album (2010).
 Andrea McArdle's version appears on her 70s and Sunny - Live at 54 Below album (2013).

References

External links
 
 
 

1976 songs
1977 debut singles
Kenny Loggins songs
Barbra Streisand songs
Songs written by Kenny Loggins
Songs with lyrics by Alan Bergman
Songs with lyrics by Marilyn Bergman
Columbia Records singles
Song recordings produced by Phil Ramone